SS Ponce De Leon was a Liberty ship built in the United States during World War II. She was named after Ponce De Leon, a Spanish explorer and conquistador known for leading the first official European expedition to Florida and the first governor of Puerto Rico.

Construction
Ponce De Leon was laid down on 15 August 1942, under a Maritime Commission (MARCOM) contract, MC hull 1193, by the St. Johns River Shipbuilding Company, Jacksonville, Florida; she was sponsored by Mrs. J.C. Merrill, the wife of the president of the St. John's River SB Corp., she was launched on 14 March 1943.

History
She was allocated to Waterman Steamship Corp., on 30 April 1943. On 11 April 1947, she was laid up in the, National Defense Reserve Fleet, Mobile, Alabama. She was sold for scrapping, on 10 September 1962, to Gulf Shipyard Industrial Park Co., for $49,799. She was removed from the fleet on 9 October 1962.

References

Bibliography

 
 
 
 

 

Liberty ships
Ships built in Jacksonville, Florida
1943 ships
Mobile Reserve Fleet